Rev Racing, short for Revolution Racing, is an auto racing team competing at the regional level of NASCAR. Owned by former Dale Earnhardt, Inc. president Max Siegel, the team primarily fields participants in the Drive for Diversity, an initiative to bring more minority and female drivers into the sport. In all three ARCA Menards Series, Rev Racing currently fields two Chevrolet SS teams: The No. 2 for Nick Sanchez and the No. 6 for Rajah Caruth. The team also fields late model and Legends car entries for various drivers, and has fielded entries for future NASCAR national series winners Kyle Larson, Bubba Wallace, and Daniel Suárez in the past.

History

Following the 2008 season, NASCAR cut ties with the Drive for Diversity's managing company Access Marketing & Communications after several reports of teams not receiving adequate funds, drivers not receiving competitive equipment, and limited results on the track. NASCAR proceeded to hire Max Siegel  to revamp the program into an academy-like setting. In 2010, Siegel founded Rev Racing to field the drivers in the K&N Pro Series and Weekly Series and is also responsible for finding sponsorship for the drivers. By the end of 2011, Rev Racing had more than doubled the win total of the previous D4D program, winning a total of eight races in the K&N Pro Series (compared to three wins in the old program, all by Paulie Harraka).

2010

For its inaugural season, Revolution Racing purchased the equipment from Andy Santerre Racing, with Santerre becoming the team's general manager and a crew chief. In its debut season, Rev Racing fielded 10 drivers: four in the K&N Pro Series East, one in the NASCAR K&N Pro Series West, and five in the Whelen All-American Series. Paulie Harraka, in his fifth year in the D4D program, finished 3rd in the K&N West Series standings including a pole and a win in the season opener at All American Speedway. Bubba Wallace won rookie of the year in the K&N East Series, with two wins and a third-place points finish. In addition to Wallace being the first African American to win a race in the series, teammate Ryan Gifford became the first black driver to win a pole (at Martinsville Speedway). Gifford would finish 9th in points.

2011
Wallace Jr. continued his success in 2011, winning three races, 3 poles, and finishing second in series points. He and Gifford were joined by Sergio Pena, who won three races in the K&N East Series as well, finishing 5th in points.  Overall, the team won half of all the K&N East Series races.

2012
For 2012, the team downsized from ten drivers to six but added talented driver Kyle Larson to its stable. Larson had the team and D4D's best season to date, winning two races and earning 12 top 10s en route to the K&N East Series Championship.

2013
In 2013, NASCAR Toyota Series driver and Mexico native Daniel Suárez joined the team, running both the Toyota Series in Mexico and the K&N East Series for Rev Racing. Suarez won at Columbus Motor Speedway, and finished 3rd in points with nine top 10s. He moved to the NASCAR Mexico Series – now the NASCAR Toyota Series – in 2010, driving for Telcel Racing; despite running only a partial season, he won the series' Rookie of the Year title.  Ryan Gifford won his first race, the Blue Ox 100, on April 27 at Richmond International Raceway. Gifford started 11th and worked his way to the front, beating Brandon Gdovic and Cole Custer on a late-race restart. Gifford would finish 11th in points with four top 5s and six top 10s.

2014
For 2014, Suarez, Pena, and Gifford returned as D4D drivers, while Mackena Bell returned for her 5th season (though not part of D4D). They were joined by rookie K&N East driver Jay Beasley and Whelen All-American drivers Devon Amos and Paige Decker.

2015
Jay Beasley returned to the K&N East Series, joined by Devin Amos. Newcomers to the team included NASCAR Next member Kenzie Ruston, Collin Cabre, Natalie Decker, and Dylan Smith.

2022
On December 9, 2021, Chevrolet announced a multi-year engineering and marketing partnership with Rev Racing. By the end of the 2022 season, Nick Sanchez claimed the team's first ARCA championship.

2023
On November 4, 2022, Rev Racing announced a technical alliance with Kyle Busch Motorsports and its expansion into the NASCAR Craftsman Truck Series, fielding the No. 2 Chevrolet for Sanchez in 2023.

Former drivers
Kyle Larson
Bubba Wallace
Daniel Suárez
Sergio Pena
Marc Davis
Ryan Gifford
Rubén García Jr.
Paige Decker
Mackena Bell
Kenzie Ruston
Enrique Baca
Jairo Avila Jr.
Natalie Decker
Chase Cabre
Ernie Francis Jr.
Ryan Vargas
Gracie Trotter
Blake Lothian

References

External links

ARCA Menards Series teams
NASCAR teams
Auto racing teams established in 2010